Utica is the name of some places in the U.S. state of Wisconsin:
Utica, Crawford County, Wisconsin, a town
Utica, Winnebago County, Wisconsin, a town
Utica, Dane County, Wisconsin, an unincorporated community